The Chingleput Ryots' Case was a prominent trial which took place in the then Chingleput District of the Madras Presidency in India between 1881 and 1883. The action of the th M. E. Grant Duff provoked outrage all over the Presidency. Indian nationalists frequently cited the case as an example of the alleged unjust rule of the British Raj.

Origin 

In May 1881, a group of ryots in the then Chingleput district accused an Indian tahsildar of extortion and filed a case against him in a local court.  The tahsildar tried to threaten the ryots with dire consequences and allegedly got the District Collector of Chingleput to prosecute them for perjury. However, the tahsildar was still convicted for tampering with official records and sentenced to rigorous imprisonment. The tahsildar filed a fresh appeal in the Madras High Court resulting in the reduction of the sentence from two to one year. Dissatisfied, the tahsildar appealed once again against the verdict. Though the Madras High Court refused to entertain a second appeal, the Governor of Madras intervened and issued an order on 31 May 1883 acquitting the tahsildar due to lack of evidence

The District Collector of Chingleput who had allegedly shielded the corrupt tahsildar later acted as the Revenue Secretary of the Government of Madras.

Reaction 

The Governor was heavily condemned and criticized by the Indian press for acquitting the corrupt tahsildar. The Hindu, which had supported the ryots throughout the trial and even collected money to fight the case on their behalf, charged him with allowing the affair "to cast dirt on the fair face of British Justice".

The incident was brought before the House of Commons and Sir John Gorst, the Under-Secretary of State for India was questioned by James Tuite, the British Member of Parliament for Westmeath North in February 1887.

References 

Sources

 

Indian case law
Madras Presidency
Trials in India
1881 in India
1882 in India
1883 in India
1881 in British India
1882 in British India
1883 in British India